The 2019 Cargill Curling Training Centre Icebreaker was held from August 23 to 25 in Morris, Manitoba. It was the fourth event of the 2019–20 curling season. The total purse for the event was $7,480 on both the Men's and Women's side.

In the Men's event, Jason Gunnlaugson defeated Ty Dilello 7–5 in the final and in the Women's event, Tracy Fleury defeated Tori Koana 5–3 in the final.

Men

Teams

The teams are listed as follows:

Knockout Brackets

Source:

A Event

B Event

Knockout results

Source:

Draw 1
Friday, August 23, 6:00 pm

Draw 3
Saturday, August 24, 10:00 am

Draw 5
Saturday, August 24, 4:00 pm

Playoffs

Source:

Quarterfinals
Sunday, August 25, 9:00 am

Semifinals
Sunday, August 25, 12:00 pm

Final
Sunday, August 25, 3:00 pm

Women

Teams

The teams are listed as follows:

Knockout Brackets

Source:

A Event

B Event

Knockout results

Source:

Draw 2
Friday, August 23, 9:00 pm

Draw 4
Saturday, August 24, 1:00 pm

Draw 5
Saturday, August 24, 4:00 pm

Playoffs

Source:

Quarterfinals
Sunday, August 25, 9:00 am

Semifinals
Sunday, August 25, 12:00 pm

Final
Sunday, August 25, 3:00 pm

References

External links
Men's Event
Women's Event

Morris, Manitoba
2019 in Canadian curling
Curling in Manitoba
August 2019 sports events in Canada
2019 in Manitoba